Philiopsis is a genus of often colorful, medium-sized sea slugs, marine opisthobranch gastropod mollusks. These are not nudibranchs; instead they are headshield slugs, in the clade Cephalaspidea.

Species
Recognized species within the genus Philinopsis are:

References

Further reading 
 Rudman W. B. (1972). "A comparative study of the genus Philinopsis Pease, 1860 (Aglajidae, Opisthobranchia)". Pacific Science 26(4): 381-399. https://scholarspace.manoa.hawaii.edu/handle/10125/443
 Pease, W.H. (1860) Descriptions of new species of Mollusca from the Sandwich Islands (Part II). Proceedings of the Zoological Society of London, 1860, 141–148. 
 Gofas, S.; Le Renard, J.; Bouchet, P. (2001). Mollusca, in: Costello, M.J. et al. (Ed.) (2001). European register of marine species: a check-list of the marine species in Europe and a bibliography of guides to their identification. Collection Patrimoines Naturels, 50: pp. 180–213
 Ortea, Moro & Espinosa (2007). Revista Academia Canar. Cienc. XVIII (4) : 33-52
 Gosliner T.M. (2011) Six new species of aglajid opisthobranch mollusks from the tropical Indo-Pacific. Zootaxa 2751: 1–24. page 7

 
Gastropod genera
Taxa named by William Harper Pease